U.X.O. is the third studio album by Canadian post-rock band Godspeed You! Black Emperor, released on November 4, 2002 by Constellation. It was recorded by Steve Albini at Electrical Audio in Chicago in late 2001, and was the band's first album released after their slight name change (moving the exclamation mark from the "emperor" to the "you"). Lacking both their characteristic interwoven field recordings and specifically named movements, the album was instead described by the band as "just raw, angry, dissonant, epic instrumental rock". Shortly after its release, the group announced an indefinite hiatus so band members could pursue differing musical interests; it was their last album for a decade until the release of 2012's 'Allelujah! Don't Bend! Ascend!.

Background
 is the Spanish word for "Yankee". The liner notes also refer to "Yanqui" as a "multinational corporate oligarchy", while "U.X.O." stands for "unexploded ordnance". The packaging of the album contains an arrow diagram purporting to represent the links between four major record labels (AOL Time-Warner, BMG, Sony, Vivendi Universal) and various arms manufacturers. This chart accompanied a photograph of falling bombs. The band later admitted that a particular extension of the chart (namely EMI appearing on the chart as a subsidiary of AOL Time-Warner) was incorrect, conceding that some of their research had been inaccurate.

The album was released as a CD and a double vinyl LP, the latter having three noticeable differences. One is the compounding of the two-part composition "09-15-00" (the album liner notes imply that on this date the second Palestinian intifada began, although this is incorrect) into one. Another is the addition of an untitled "hidden" track after some silence (it is masked in a similar manner with the short song "J.L.H. Outro" on the CD release of F♯ A♯ ∞); this ulterior track consists of a sampled and cut-up George W. Bush speech with applause added (it also appears on bandmember Aidan Girt's related project 1-Speed Bike's debut album Droopy Butt Begone! (2000) in the track "The Day that Mauro Ran Over Elwy Yost", as well as on Museum Fire Records' compilation Azadi! (2003), a benefit for the Revolutionary Association of the Women of Afghanistan where it is titled "George Bush Cut Up While Talking"). Finally, the second section of the two-part track "motherfucker=redeemer" is about five minutes longer on the LP due to an extended ambient opening.

Common alternate titles for certain pieces used by the band on setlists include "12-28-99" (which became "09-15-00"), "Tazer Floyd" (became "Rockets Fall on Rocket Falls"), and "Tiny Silver Hammers" (became "motherfucker=redeemer").

Recording
The album was recorded at Electrical Audio by Steve Albini. The record was mixed by the band and Howard Bilerman (who also did some additional recording) at the Hotel2Tango in Montreal, and mastered by John Loder and Steve Rooke at Abbey Road Studios in London, UK.

Reception

Yanqui U.X.O is the band's most critically divisive record. While some, such as Thom Jurek of AllMusic, praised the release as being among the group's finest albums, others, like Ryan Schreiber of Pitchfork, derided it for its "sluggishness and a lack of invention".

Playlouder ranked the album at number 47 on their list of the top 50 albums of 2002.

Track listing

Compact Disc

Vinyl edition

Personnel
Godspeed You! Black Emperor
Thierry Amar – bass guitar, double bass
David Bryant – electric guitar
Bruce Cawdron – drums
Aidan Girt – drums
Norsola Johnson – cello
Efrim Menuck – electric guitar
Mauro Pezzente – bass guitar
Roger Tellier-Craig – electric guitar
Sophie Trudeau – violin

Other musicians
Josh Abrams – double bass
Geof Bradfield – bass clarinet
Rob Mazurek – trumpet
Matana Roberts – clarinet

Production
Steve Albini – recording, production
Howard Bilerman – mixing
Godspeed You! Black Emperor – mixing
John Loder – mastering
Steve Rooke – mastering

References

External links
 Yanqui U.X.O. at Constellation Records

2002 albums
Albums produced by Steve Albini
Constellation Records (Canada) albums
Godspeed You! Black Emperor albums
Instrumental rock albums